The Eurovision Young Dancers 2011 was the twelfth edition of the Eurovision Young Dancers, held at the  Dance House in Oslo, Norway on 24 June 2011. Organised by the European Broadcasting Union (EBU) and host broadcaster the Norwegian Broadcasting Corporation (NRK), dancers from ten countries participated in the televised final.  and  made their début while  and  returned. Seven countries withdrew from the contest. This was the first edition to be successfully held since , following cancellations in 2009 and 2007.

The event was aimed at young dancers aged between 15 and 21, competing in modern dances, be it solo or in couples, as long as they were not professionally engaged. Daniel Sarr of Norway won the contest, with Petra Zupančić of Slovenia placing second (runner-up).

Location

Dansens Hus (English: Dance House) in Oslo, Norway was the host venue for the 2011 edition of the Eurovision Young Dancers.

Format
The format is revamped in 2011 to include a 'final duel' round, with the semi-finals removed due to the low number of participating countries. The televised prime time show consists of dancers who are non-professional and between the ages of 16–21, competing in a performance of dance routines of their choice, which they have prepared in advance of the competition. All of the acts then take part in a choreographed group dance during 'Young Dancers Week'.

Presenters
Erik Solbakken was the host of the 2011 contest. Solbakken previously hosted the Eurovision Song Contest 2010 in Oslo, alongside Haddy Jatou N'jie and Nadia Hasnaoui.

Jury panel
Jury members of a professional aspect and representing the elements of ballet, contemporary, and modern dancing styles, score each of the competing individual and group dance routines. Once all the jury votes have been counted, the two participants which received the highest total of points progress to a final round. The final round consists of a 90-second 'dual', were each of the finalists perform a 45-second random dance-off routine. The overall winner upon completion of the final dances is chosen by the professional jury members. 

The jury members consisted of the following:
  – Michael Nunn
  – William Trevitt
  – Fredrik Rydman
  – Ilze Liepa

Participants

Results

Final duel

Broadcasting
The contest was broadcast by the following broadcasters:

See also
 Eurovision Song Contest 2011
 Junior Eurovision Song Contest 2011

References

External links 
 

Eurovision Young Dancers by year
2011 in Norway
June 2011 events in Europe
Events in Oslo
2010s in Oslo